Pondok Pesantren Millenium Alfina is a co-educational boarding school of the Indonesia Institute of Islamic Dawah in East Java, Indonesia. It opened in 2000. Current enrollment is c. 200, with a 20:1 student-teacher ratio.

Instruction is conducted in the Javanese language, and centers on the Quran and Hadith.

External links 
 Situs Resmi LDII
 LDII Sidoarjo
 LDII Jatim

Pesantren in Indonesia